Kresy refers to the former Polish eastern borderlands.

Kresy may also refer to the following villages:
Kresy, Łódź Voivodeship (central Poland)
Kresy, Podlaskie Voivodeship (north-east Poland)